Nyugdi (Nüğdi) is a rural locality (a selo) in Derbentsky District of the Republic of Dagestan, Russia. Population: 1,700 (2002).

Notable people
Sergey Izgiyayev, writer
Hizgil Avshalumov, writer

Rural localities in Derbentsky District